Admiral Sir Barry Edward Domvile,  (5 September 1878 – 13 August 1971) was a high-ranking Royal Navy officer who was interned during the Second World War for being a Nazi sympathiser.
Throughout the 1930s, he had expressed support for Germany's Adolf Hitler as well as pro-Nazi and anti-Semitic sentiments.

Naval career
Domvile was the son of Admiral Sir Compton Domvile and followed his father into the Royal Navy in 1892. In 1912, he became Assistant Secretary to the Committee of Imperial Defence, and during World War I he commanded the destroyer HMS Miranda, the destroyer HMS Tipperary, the cruiser HMS Centaur and then the cruiser HMS Curacoa. After the war, he became Director of Plans in 1920, and Chief of Staff to the Commander-in-Chief, Mediterranean in 1922 before becoming, in 1925, commanding officer of the battleship HMS Royal Sovereign.

He served as Director of Naval Intelligence from 1927 to 1930, then commanded the Third Cruiser Squadron from 1931 to 1932, and served as President of the Royal Naval College, Greenwich from 1932 to 1934.

Far-right activism 
Domvile visited Germany in 1935 and was impressed by many aspects of the Nazi government. He was invited to attend the Nuremberg Rally of September 1936 as a guest of German Ambassador Joachim von Ribbentrop. Domvile became a council member of the Anglo-German Fellowship and founded the Anglo-German organisation The Link.

Domvile supported St. John Philby, the anti-Semitic British People's Party candidate in the Hythe by-election of 1939, and visited Salzburg that summer, which attracted some criticism.

Domvile was prominent in British far-right circles as the prospect of war seemed imminent in the late 1930s. At one meeting of the Right Club, which had been set up in May 1939, he declared the need for "a bloody revolution" in Britain and added "I am ready to start one right away."

Domvile's pro-Nazi and anti-war sympathies were expressed in an endorsement to the 1939 book The Case For Germany. His endorsement consisted of the comment in the preface:
"It is a great pleasure to me to introduce the public to Dr. Laurie's valuable book on modern Germany.

He is best known to the world as a brilliant scientist, but he
has found time in the intervals of his work to pursue with ardour the task upon which every sensible member of the British and German races should be engaged – namely the establishment of good relations and a better understanding between these two great nations.

Dr. Laurie knows full well that this friendship is the keystone to peace in Europe – nay, in the whole world. He is one of the small group who founded the Association known as "The Link", whose sole aim is to get Britons and Germans to know and understand one another better. He is one of the most zealous workers in this good cause in the country.

He writes of the National Socialist movement with knowledge and great sympathy. The particular value of this book lies in the fact that it is written by a foreigner, who cannot be accused of patriotic excess in his interpretation of the great work done by Herr Hitler and his associates. I recommend this volume with confidence to all people who are genuinely impressed with the desire to understand one of the greatest – and most bloodless – revolutions in history."

Admiral Sir Barry Domvile 8 May 1939

World War II
In June 1940, Domvile's mistress, Mrs Olive Baker, was arrested for distributing leaflets promoting Reichssender Hamburg. She tried to commit suicide in prison and was sentenced to five years' imprisonment.

Domvile himself was interned during World War II under Defence Regulation 18B from 7 July 1940 to 29 July 1943.

During his wartime captivity, he wrote an autobiographical memoir, From Admiral to Cabin Boy. It was first published in 1947 and republished in 2008.

Later life
Domvile largely faded from public life in the postwar period. He was a supporter of the League of Empire Loyalists but was never more than a peripheral figure in that group. He was a member of the National Front's National Council from its formation in 1967 to his death in 1971.

Books 
By and Large, pub Hutchinson, 1936 (His autobiography)
From Admiral to Cabin Boy (1947; the cabin referred to is his cell at Brixton prison during internment) ; online
Look to Your Moat (A history of British naval and merchant seamen)
The Great Taboo: Freemasonry
Straight from the Jew's Mouth
Truth about Anti-Semitism

References

|-

1878 births
1971 deaths
Royal Navy admirals
British fascists
Anti-Masonry
People detained under Defence Regulation 18B
Knights Commander of the Order of the British Empire
Companions of the Order of the Bath
Companions of the Order of St Michael and St George
Royal Navy officers of World War I
Directors of Naval Intelligence
Admiral presidents of the Royal Naval College, Greenwich